Version 2014.2 of the IUCN Red List of Threatened Species identified 4574 Critically Endangered species, subspecies and varieties, stocks and subpopulations.

For IUCN lists of critically endangered species by kingdom, see:

Animals (kingdom Animalia) — IUCN Red List Critically Endangered species (Animalia)
Amphibians — List of critically endangered amphibians
Birds — List of critically endangered birds
Fish — List of critically endangered fishes
Invertebrates — List of critically endangered invertebrates
Arthropods — List of critically endangered arthropods
Insects — List of critically endangered insects
Molluscs List of critically endangered molluscs
Mammals — List of critically endangered mammals
Reptiles — List of critically endangered reptiles
Fungi (kingdom Fungi) — List of fungi by conservation status
Plants (kingdom Plantae) — List of critically endangered plants
Protists (kingdom Protista) — List of Chromista by conservation status

See also
 :Category:IUCN Red List critically endangered species
 Lists of IUCN Red List endangered species
 Lists of IUCN Red List vulnerable species
 Lists of IUCN Red List near threatened species

References
 IUCN 2014. IUCN Red List of Threatened Species. Version 2014.2. Source of the above list: online IUCN Red List. Retrieved 30 August 2014.